Stewart Castledine (born 22 January 1973) is an English former professional footballer, actor, model and television presenter.

As a footballer, he was a midfielder who notably played in the Premier League for Wimbledon before playing with Wycombe Wanderers in the Football League over two separate spells. Castledine made 28 league top flight appearances for the Dons.

Following retirement he worked as a TV presenter for the BBC and presented Big Strong Boys and Houses Behaving Badly. He also worked as a model for DKNY and Topman and had a role as an actor in the film Pink Panther.

Playing career
Educated at Teddington School, Castledine had a ten-year career as a professional footballer, playing in the Premier League for Wimbledon and in Division 1 for Wycombe Wanderers.

He began his career with Wimbledon as an apprentice in 1989, turning professional for the 1991-92 season and making his debut in the old Football League First Division against Norwich City in a 1–1 draw on 25 April 1992. He then scored in his full debut against Coventry City, went on score further Premier League goals against Everton and Leeds, and remained with the Dons in the Premier League for a further eight years, although he was never a regular member of the first team. During that time he played in matches against Manchester United, Chelsea, Arsenal and Liverpool amongst others.

He also had a loan spell with Wycombe Wanderers in the 1995-96 season, scoring three goals in seven Division Two games, and finally left the Dons on 7 July 2000. His departure coincided with Wimbledon's relegation from the Premier League after 14 years of top flight football. He then signed for Wycombe Wanderers, making 22 appearances over the next two seasons before finally retiring as a player at the age of 29. While at Adams Park, he played under his old Wimbledon teammate Lawrie Sanchez, who was Wycombe manager.

Post-playing career
Immediately after his football career, Castledine become a television presenter, hosting BBC1's Big Strong Boys and Houses Behaving Badly. He also modelled for companies such as DKNY and Topman. Along with modelling Castledine had some time in the film industry with films such as Pink Panther starring him to be a French goalkeeper.

Castledine then moved into the business sector of sport. He was director of football for Soccerex, and a director for sports marketing agency Sports Revolution. Castledine is now commercial director for the sports division of talent management agency James Grant.

He later coached AFC Wimbledon Ladies.

Personal life
He is married to TV presenter Lucy Alexander; the couple have two children, including Leo, who is a footballer for Chelsea, having also played for AFC Wimbledon.
And he has two sisters, Jenny and Ellen

Career statistics

References

External links

1973 births
Living people
English footballers
Wimbledon F.C. players
Wycombe Wanderers F.C. players
English Football League players
Premier League players
Association football midfielders